Women's trampoline competition at the 2008 Summer Olympics was held on August 18 at the Beijing National Indoor Stadium.

The competition consisted of two rounds. In the first, each gymnast performed two routines on the trampoline. One routine included required elements, while the other was a voluntary routine. Scores were given for both execution and difficulty in each routine, summed to give a routine score. The two routine scores in the first round determined qualification for the second; the eight top finishers moved on to the final. The final consisted entirely of a single voluntary routine, with no preliminary scores being carried over.

Qualification round

 Q = Qualified for Finals
 R = Reserve

Final

References

 Competition format
 Qualification Results
 Final Results

2008 Women's
Trampoline, Women's
2008 in women's gymnastics
Women's events at the 2008 Summer Olympics